Staintondale (or Stainton Dale) is a small village and civil parish in the Scarborough district of North Yorkshire, England.

According to the 2011 UK census, Stainton Dale parish had a population of 341, an increase on the 2001 UK census figure of 319 - note these figures includes Ravenscar as well as Staintondale.

The parish council is Staintondale Parish Council.

History 
Staintondale was historically a township in the ancient parish of Scalby. It became a separate civil parish in 1866.

The village was served by Staintondale railway station on the Scarborough and Whitby Railway from 1885 until it closed in 1965.

References

External links

Staintondale Parish Council website

Villages in North Yorkshire
Civil parishes in North Yorkshire
Borough of Scarborough